America – South Africa is a 1991 album by the Art Ensemble of Chicago and the Amabutho Male Chorus released on the Japanese DIW label in association with Columbia Records. It features performances by Lester Bowie, Joseph Jarman, Roscoe Mitchell, Malachi Favors Maghostut and Don Moye with vocals by Elliot Ngubane, Kay Ngwazene, Welcome "Max" Bhe Bhe, Zacheuus Nyoni and Joe Leguabe.

Reception
The Allmusic review by Ron Wynn describes the album as a mix of "African rhythms, township melodies, and the Ensemble's usual array of blistering solos, vocal effects, percussive colors, and furious collective improvisations".

Track listing 
 "U.S. Of A. - U. Of S.A." (Art Ensemble of Chicago, Leguwabe) - 17:56
 "Colors One" (Art Ensemble of Chicago) - 3:52
 "Eric T" (Jarman) - 3:11
 "You Got It" (Art Ensemble of Chicago) - 14:12
 "America" (Amabutho Male Chorus) - 5:12
 "Zola's Smile" (Art Ensemble of Chicago) -  3:52
 Recorded December 1989 & January 1990 at Systems Two Studios, Brooklyn, NY

Personnel 
 Lester Bowie: trumpet, fluegelhorn, percussion
 Malachi Favors Maghostut: bass, balafon, percussion instruments
 Joseph Jarman: saxophones, clarinets, percussion instruments
 Roscoe Mitchell: saxophones, clarinets, flute, percussion instruments
 Don Moye: drums, percussion
 Elliot Ngubane: lead vocals, percussion, keyboards
 Kay Ngwazene: vocals
 Welcome "Max" Bhe Bhe: vocals
 Zacheuus Nyoni: vocals
 Joe Leguabe: vocals, percussion

References 

1991 albums
DIW Records albums
Art Ensemble of Chicago albums